Fluorouracil (5-FU), sold under the brand name Adrucil among others, is a cytotoxic chemotherapy medication used to treat cancer. By intravenous injection it is used for treatment of colorectal cancer, oesophageal cancer, stomach cancer, pancreatic cancer, breast cancer, and cervical cancer. As a cream it is used for actinic keratosis, basal cell carcinoma, and skin warts.

Side effects of use by injection are common. They may include inflammation of the mouth, loss of appetite, low blood cell counts, hair loss, and inflammation of the skin. When used as a cream, irritation at the site of application usually occurs. Use of either form in pregnancy may harm the baby. Fluorouracil is in the antimetabolite and pyrimidine analog families of medications. How it works is not entirely clear, but it is believed to involve blocking the action of thymidylate synthase and thus stopping the production of DNA.

Fluorouracil was patented in 1956 and came into medical use in 1962. It is on the World Health Organization's List of Essential Medicines.

Medical uses

Fluorouracil has been given systemically for anal, breast, colorectal, oesophageal, stomach, pancreatic and skin cancers (especially head and neck cancers). It has also been given topically (on the skin) for actinic keratoses, skin cancers and Bowen's disease and as eye drops for treatment of ocular surface squamous neoplasia. Other uses include ocular injections into a previously created trabeculectomy bleb to inhibit healing and cause scarring of tissue, thus allowing adequate aqueous humor flow to reduce intraocular pressure.

Contraindications
Fluorouracil is contraindicated in patients who are severely debilitated and in patients with bone marrow suppression due to either radiotherapy or chemotherapy. It is likewise contraindicated in pregnant or breastfeeding women. Non-topical use, i.e.  administration by injection, should be avoided in patients who do not have malignant illnesses.

Adverse effects
Adverse effects by frequency include:

During systemic use
Common (> 1% frequency):
 Nausea
 Vomiting
 Diarrhea (see below for details)
 Mucositis
 Headache
 Myelosuppression (see below for details)
 Alopecia (hair loss)
 Photosensitivity
 Hand-foot syndrome
 Maculopapular eruption
 Itch
 Cardiotoxicity (see below for details)
 Persistent hiccups
 Mood disorders (irritability, anxiety, depression)

Uncommon (0.1–1% frequency):

 Oesophagitis
 GI ulceration and bleeding
 Proctitis
 Nail disorders
 Vein pigmentation
 Confusion
 Cerebellar syndrome
 Encephalopathy
 Visual changes
 Photophobia
 Lacrimation (the expulsion of tears without any emotional or physiologic reason)

Rare (< 0.1% frequency):
 Anaphylaxis 
 Allergic reactions
 Fever without signs of infection
 Mania, reversible dementia

Diarrhea is severe and may be dose-limiting and is exacerbated by co-treatment with calcium folinate. Neutropenia tends to peak about 9–14 days after beginning treatment. Thrombocytopenia tends to peak about 7–17 days after the beginning of treatment and tends to recover about 10 days after its peak. Cardiotoxicity is a fairly common side effect, usually manifesting as angina or symptoms associated with coronary artery spasm, but about 0.55% of those receiving the drug will develop life-threatening cardiotoxicity. Life-threatening cardiotoxicity includes: arrhythmias, ventricular tachycardia and cardiac arrest, secondary to transmural ischaemia.

During topical use
Common (> 1% frequency):

 Local pain
 Itchiness
 Burning
 Stinging
 Crusting
 Weeping
 Dermatitis
 Photosensitivity

Uncommon (0.1–1% frequency):
 Hyper- or hypopigmentation
 Scarring

Neurological damage
The United States package insert warns that acute cerebellar syndrome has been observed following injection of fluorouracil and may persist after cessation of treatment. Symptoms include ataxia, nystagmus, and dysmetria.

Potential overdose
There is very little difference between the minimum effective dose and maximum tolerated dose of 5-FU, and the drug exhibits marked individual pharmacokinetic variability. Therefore, an identical dose of 5-FU may result in a therapeutic response with acceptable toxicity in some patients and unacceptable and possibly life-threatening toxicity in others. Both overdosing and underdosing are of concern with 5-FU, although several studies have shown that the majority of colorectal cancer patients treated with 5-FU are underdosed based on today's dosing standard, body surface area (BSA). The limitations of BSA-based dosing prevent oncologists from being able to accurately titer the dosage of 5-FU for the majority of individual patients, which results in sub-optimal treatment efficacy or excessive toxicity.

Numerous studies have found significant relationships between concentrations of 5-FU in blood plasma and both desirable or undesirable effects on patients. Studies have also shown that dosing based on the concentration of 5-FU in plasma can greatly increase desirable outcomes while minimizing negative side effects of 5-FU therapy. One such test that has been shown to successfully monitor 5-FU plasma levels and which "may contribute to improved efficacy and safety of commonly used 5-FU-based chemotherapies" is the My5-FU test.

Interactions
Its use should be avoided in patients receiving drugs known to modulate dihydropyrimidine dehydrogenase (such as the antiviral drug sorivudine). It may also increase the INR and prothrombin times in patients on warfarin. Fluorouracil's efficacy is decreased when used alongside allopurinol, which can be used to decrease fluorouracil induced stomatitis through use of allopurinol mouthwash.

Pharmacology

Pharmacogenetics

The dihydropyrimidine dehydrogenase (DPD) enzyme is responsible for the detoxifying metabolism of fluoropyrimidines, a class of drugs that includes 5-fluorouracil, capecitabine, and tegafur. Genetic variations within the DPD gene (DPYD) can lead to reduced or absent DPD activity, and individuals who are heterozygous or homozygous for these variations may have partial or complete DPD deficiency; an estimated 0.2% of individuals have complete DPD deficiency. Those with partial or complete DPD deficiency have a significantly increased risk of severe or even fatal drug toxicities when treated with fluoropyrimidines; examples of toxicities include myelosuppression, neurotoxicity and hand-foot syndrome.

Mechanism of action
5-FU acts in several ways, but principally as a thymidylate synthase (TS) inhibitor. Interrupting the action of this enzyme blocks synthesis of the pyrimidine thymidylate (dTMP), which is a nucleotide required for DNA replication. Thymidylate synthase methylates deoxyuridine monophosphate (dUMP) to form thymidine monophosphate (dTMP). Administration of 5-FU causes a scarcity in dTMP, so rapidly dividing cancerous cells undergo cell death via thymineless death. Calcium folinate provides an exogenous source of reduced folinates and hence stabilises the 5-FU-TS complex, hence enhancing 5-FU's cytotoxicity.

History
In 1954, Abraham Cantarow and Karl Paschkis found liver tumors absorbed radioactive uracil more readily than did normal liver cells. Charles Heidelberger, who had earlier found that fluorine in fluoroacetic acid inhibited a vital enzyme, asked Robert Duschinsky and Robert Schnitzer at Hoffmann-La Roche to synthesize fluorouracil. Some credit Heidelberger and Duschinsky with the discovery that 5-fluorouracil markedly inhibited tumors in mice. The original 1957 report in Nature has Heidelberger as lead author, along with N. K. Chaudhuri, Peter Danneberg, Dorothy Mooren, Louis Griesbach, Robert Duschinsky, R. J. Schnitzer, E. Pleven, and J. Scheiner.
In 1958, Anthony R. Curreri, Fred J. Ansfield, Forde A. McIver, Harry A. Waisman, and Charles Heidelberger reported the first clinical findings of 5-FU's activity in cancer in humans.

Natural analogues
In 2003, scientists isolated 5-fluorouracil derivatives, closely related compounds, from the marine sponge, Phakellia fusca collected around the Yongxing Island of the Xisha Islands in the South China Sea. This is significant because fluorine-containing organic compounds are rare in nature, and  also because manmade anticancer drugs are not frequently found to have analogues in nature.

Interactive pathway map

Names
The name "fluorouracil" is the INN, USAN, USP name, and BAN. The form "5-fluorouracil" is often used; it shows that there is a fluorine atom on the 5th carbon of a uracil ring.

References

Further reading

External links
 
 

Fluoropyrimidines
Nucleobases
Organofluorides
Pyrimidine antagonists
Pyrimidinediones
Thymidylate synthase inhibitors
Uracil derivatives
World Health Organization essential medicines
Wikipedia medicine articles ready to translate